Nina Ahlstedt née Lingell (1853–1907) was a Finnish painter (belonging to Swedish-speaking population of Finland).

Biography

She studied at the art school in Turku (1871–1876) and at the Académie Colarossi in Paris (1880–81 and again in 1897). After a début in 1878, she presented her work at the Finnish Artists Exhibitions in 1892, 1894–1899, 1902 and 1904. Ahlstedt was one of the first artists to join Victor Westerholm in the artists colony at Önningeby on the island of Åland in 1886. She and her husband Fredrik Ahlstedt, also a painter, returned there in subsequent years.

Gallery

References

1853 births
1907 deaths
19th-century Finnish painters
19th-century Finnish women artists
People from Turku
Swedish-speaking Finns
Finnish women painters